The Return of the Musketeers, or The Treasures of Cardinal Mazarin is a 2009 Russian musical film directed by Georgi Yungvald-Khilkevich.

Plot 
The film begins with the final scene of The Vicomte of Bragelonne: Ten Years Later, an 1847-1850 novel by Alexander Dumas. The musketeers Aramis and Porthos are killed in a fight against royal guardsmen. After sensing their deaths, Athos commits suicide by poisoning himself in his own estate. While serving in the Franco-Dutch War as commander of the royal troops, d'Artagnan eventually becomes a Marshal of France as it was predicted by Athos at the Siege of La Rochelle, but is killed by a cannonball at the Siege of Maastricht after barely getting the cherished baton. The friends, who had hitherto been invincible and inseparable, suddenly die in one day.

At this point, a total muddle reigns inside France. In the Parliament, fierce debates rage over the stealing from the treasury, for which Cardinal Mazarin, who secretly left France with the royal treasure, is truly responsible. Yet, the Parliament and the people find Queen Anne of Austria, a lover of Mazarin, guilty. As her honor's defenders are no longer alive, the queen feels an urgent need to find new ones. Those are the musketeers' children—Jacqueline the daughter of d'Artagnan, Raul the son of Athos, Henry the son of Aramis, and Angelica the daughter of Porthos. The captain of the Royal Guards, Leon, initially stands against the formed quartet, until he finds out he is the son of Porthos.

After the death of Cardinal Mazarin in England, his treasure passes to the Society of Jesus along with the Templar Ring that grants immortality in accordance with the legends. When the young heroes try to take back the wealth belonging to France and its queen, they are taken prisoner, while Raul is killed in an unequal skirmish. The souls of their fathers excitedly and powerlessly observe their children's adventures before a sincere prayer by d'Artagnan returns them to earth, giving a chance to save the descendants and the queen's honor. The sworn enemy of d'Artagnan, the guardsman de Jussac, revives along with them and also seeks the treasure.

As a result, the children are back together with their parents, the treacherous Jesuits are defeated and the queen's honor has finally been retained. Nevertheless, the musketeers refuse to use the retrieved Templar Ring and choose to stay together in the otherworld.

Cast 
Mikhail Boyarsky as d'Artagnan
Veniamin Smekhov as Athos
Igor Starygin as Aramis (voice Igor Yasulovich)
Valentin Smirnitsky as Porthos
Alisa Freindlich as Anne of Austria
Dmitry Kharatyan as King Louis XIV
Aleksandr Shirvindt as Colbert
Lyanka Gryu as Jacqueline, daughter of d'Artagnan
Evgeniya Kryukova as Louise de La Vallière
Danila Dunayev as Raul, son of Athos
Irina Pegova as Angelica, daughter of Porthos
Dmitry Nagiyev as Leon, son of Porthos
Anton Makarsky as Anri, son of Aramis
Anatoly Ravikovitch as Cardinal Mazarin
Vladimir Balon as de Jussac
Vitaly Alshansky as Jermen

Production 
Initial filming began on 15 June 2007 in the Ukrainian village of Fontanka, situated in the close proximity to the Black Sea. Filming later took place in Odessa, Bilhorod-Dnistrovskyi, Lviv, Svirzh, Moscow and Saint Peterburg. The production involved about 1,200 people, including extras.

Release 
The Return of the Musketeers premiered at the Oktyabr Cinema in Moscow on 4 February 2009. A longer director's cut version was broadcast on Channel One on 4 November 2009.

Reception 
The film received mostly negative reviews. It holds 2.7 out of 10 at KinoPoisk. The film critic Alex Exler noted that the film looks like a parody on the previous Musketeers films and is "so miserable and awful that it is even worth watching—such an explosion of brains is rarely seen".

References

External links 
 

2009 films
2000s musical comedy films
Cultural depictions of Cardinal Mazarin
Cultural depictions of Louis XIV
Films based on The Vicomte of Bragelonne: Ten Years Later
Films scored by Maksim Dunayevsky
Films set in the 17th century
Films shot in Moscow
Films shot in Saint Petersburg
Films shot in Ukraine
2000s Russian-language films
Russian swashbuckler films
Russian musical comedy films